

2017–18 Top 3 standings

Standings

References

Nation